Brian Augustyn (November 2, 1954 – February 1, 2022) was an American comic book editor and writer. He often worked as editor or co-writer with writer Mark Waid, such as on The Flash in the 1990s. He wrote Gotham by Gaslight – which imagines Batman tracking Jack the Ripper – the prototype of DC's Elseworlds imprint, which featured versions of their characters in alternate settings.

Career

Editing
Augustyn got his start in the industry in 1986 as an editor for Tru Studios' Trollords. He then edited Syphons and Speed Racer for NOW Comics in 1987. In 1988, he joined DC Comics, starting out as a co-editor on Action Comics during its period as a weekly title, and later The Flash, Justice League, and the Impact Comics line of titles.

As editor of The Flash beginning in 1989, Augustyn hired Mark Waid as writer in 1992, which led to an acclaimed eight-year run. Other Augustyn/Waid editor/writer partnerships included The Comet (DC/Impact, 1992) and Flash spin-off Impulse (DC, 1995–1996). He won the Wizard Fan Award for Favorite Editor in 1994.

He served as the managing editor of Visionary Comics Studio. He worked as story editor for publisher Red Giant Entertainment and their Giant-Size Comics line of free print comic book titles which debuted in 2014.

Writing
As a solo writer, Augustyn  worked on DC's Batman: Gotham by Gaslight, its sequel Batman: Master of the Future, and Black Condor; Marvel's Imperial Guard; Wildstorm Productions' Out There and Crimson; and Dreamwave Productions's Mega Man.

As co-writers, Augustyn and Mark Waid scripted The Crusaders for DC/Impact in 1992, Painkiller Jane and Ash: Cinder & Smoke for Event Comics in 1997, X-O Manowar, vol. 2, for Valiant Comics in 1997–1998, and JLA: Year One for DC in 1998–1999. After leaving his position as editor in 1996, Augustyn teamed with Waid to co-write The Flash in 1996–1997 and 1998–2000. They collaborated on The Life Story of the Flash graphic novel and co-wrote the story in The Flash #142 (October 1998) in which Wally West married Linda Park.
 
In 2014, Red Giant Entertainment announced that Augustyn was scripting a new Amped comic series which debuted in November as part of the monthly Giant-Sized line.

Personal life and death
Augustyn was born on November 2, 1954. He died from a stroke on February 1, 2022, at the age of 67 and is survived by his wife Nadine and daughters Carrie and Allie.

Bibliography

Comics work includes:

Gotham by Gaslight (with Mike Mignola, one-shot, DC Comics, 1989)
Black Mask (with Jim Baikie, 2-issue mini-series, DC Comics, 1995)
Crimson (with Humberto Ramos, 24 issue series, Wildstorm Comics, 1998)
Out There (with Humberto Ramos, Wildstorm Comics, 1998)

References

External links

Visionary Comics Studio
Red Giant Entertainment

1954 births
2022 deaths
American comics writers
Comic book editors
People from Chicago